The Baptist Church of Christ at Sardis is a church built in 1917 of the partially extinct denomination (the Baptist Church of Christ) in Mississippi. The building is one room with symmetrically placed front doors. The timber used to build it was from the local communities, and milled onsite. Both the pews and the pulpit are original, as is most of the structure. In the early 2010s, David Preziosi, executive of the National Register of Historic Places in Mississippi nominated it for historic research. This was granted to him on March 21, 2011. Today, the building is placed as a historic site as well as a genealogical center as it has a cemetery with many people who used to live near there.

References 

National Register of Historic Places in Winston County, Mississippi
Baptist churches in Mississippi
Churches on the National Register of Historic Places in Mississippi
Churches completed in 1917